José Cazorla (born 26 February 1914, date of death unknown) was a Venezuelan sports shooter. He competed in the 50 metre rifle, prone event at the 1960 Summer Olympics.

References

1914 births
Year of death missing
Venezuelan male sport shooters
Olympic shooters of Venezuela
Shooters at the 1960 Summer Olympics
People from Barcelona, Venezuela
Pan American Games medalists in shooting
Pan American Games bronze medalists for Venezuela
Shooters at the 1963 Pan American Games
20th-century Venezuelan people